Alegres vacaciones (English: Happy Holidays) is a 1948 Spanish animated film by Arturo Moreno.

References

External links

1948 films
1948 animated films
Spanish animated films
Films directed by Arturo Moreno (cartoonist)
1940s Spanish films